Arzum Onan (born October 31, 1973) is a Turkish actress, former model and Miss Europe 1993.

Biography
She was born on October 31, 1973, in Ankara, Turkey. Her family is of Circassian descent. After the primary school in Ankara, her family moved to İstanbul, where she finished the vocational high school as a draftswoman.

Arzum began her career in 1992 as a model. She participated in the Miss Turkey contest in April 1993, and won the title. The same year in July, she represented her country at the Miss Europe beauty contest held in İstanbul, and was crowned Miss Europe 1993. She became the fifth Turkish beauty queen following Günseli Başar, Filiz Vural, Nazlı Deniz Kuruoğlu and Neşe Erberk.

Since 1997, she successfully played in a number of films, mini television series and commercials.

In 1996, Arzum married the actor Mehmet Aslantuğ, from whom she has a son, Can, born in 2000. In 2005, she underwent a thyroid surgery.

Filmography
 Yeni Bir Yıldız (1997)
 Sıcak Saatler (1998)
 Aşk ve Hüzün (2000)
 Merdoğlu (2000)
 Zeybek Ateşi (2002)
 Sahra (2004)
 Sessiz Firtina (2007)
 Kardelen (2008)

References

 Official Fan Page - Biography of Arzum Onan 
 
 DiziFilm.Com - Biography of Arzum Onan 
 Who is who database - Biography of Arzum Onan 
 HyperTV - News on Arzum Onan 

1973 births
People from Ankara
Miss Turkey winners
Miss Europe winners
Living people
Turkish television actresses